Renshou County is a county in Meishan City, Sichuan Province of China. It is located in Middle-West of Sichuan Basin. Founded in the Qin dynasty. Its name may derive from the first Sui Dynasty emperor's palace located in Shaanxi province, Renshou palace. During the Southern Dynasties it was called Huairen County (怀仁县) and in the Western Wei of the Northern Dynasties it was called Puning County (普宁县). Its name was changed to Renshou in 598 during the Sui Dynasty.

Demographics 
Though Renshou is majority Han Chinese there is a small population of Hui, Yi, Dai, and Tibetan peoples in the Qinggang township (青岗乡). It is common for Han residents of different areas of Renshou to visit Qinggang for their ethnic foods, especially Hui produced meat.

Language 
While Mandarin in the official language, most residents speak the a dialect Renshou-Fushun subdialect of Sichuanese. Tonally, the Renshou dialect has a higher rising tone then the other subdialects in the region.

Climate

1993 riots 
From mid-May to June 1993, Renshou County was the site of mass anti-tax riots, where up to 10,000 peasants protested tax measures by Deng Xiaoping’s economic reforms. Causes cited for the riots include an increase in taxes and fees, failure of local officials to pay for grain collection, and the generally low income of rural residents in the area.

Tianfu New Area 
In recent years, Renshou County has integrated into the Tianfu New Area (天府新区). The distance from Renshou's downtown to Chengdu, the capital of Sichuan Province, is 110 kilometers, and 125 kilometers to Shuangliu International Airport.  It also gives Renshou access to the new Chengdu Tianfu International Airport only 100 kilometers away opened in 2021.

Transport 
China National Highway G213
China National Highway G4215
China National Highway G351
Chengzilu Expressway S4
Guanghong Expressway S40
Expressway S106
Chengdu No. 3 Raocheng Express

Townships

Schools 

 Ren Shou No.1 Middle School

Tourism 

 Heilongtan Lake 黑龙滩湖
 Stairway to Heaven Park 天梯公园
 Great Bear Pavilion 奎星阁
 Huayan Temple 华严寺
 Renshou Christian Church
 Renshou Catholic Church
Renshou Giant Buddha 仁寿大佛 (Also called Niujiaozhai Giant Buddha 牛角寨大佛)
Thousand Buddha Rock 千佛岩
Rock Buddha Ravine 石佛沟

Local Products 

 Pipa Fruit (type of loquat fruit) 枇杷
 Fengshui Pear 丰水梨
 Renshou Sesame Cake 仁寿芝麻糕
 Wangyang Dried Beef 汪洋干巴牛肉

References

External links

Official website of Renshou County Government

County-level divisions of Sichuan